Louis Harper (1868–1940) was a British civil engineer.

Louis Harper may refer to:

Louis George Harper (1830–1884), Canadian politician
Louis J. Harper, American football coach